Tokin may refer to:

Tokin (headwear) (頭襟 or 頭巾), a small black box worn on the foreheads of Yamabushi
Tokin Corporation (previously NEC Tokin), a Japanese electronic and electrical parts company
Tokin—officially NEC Tokin FC—a football (soccer) team sponsored by the above company that participated in the 2008 Japanese Regional Football League Competition
Boris P. Tokin (Борис Петрович Токин, 1900–1984), Russian scientist discoverer of Phytoncides
Mount Tokin (頭巾山 or 襟巾山), an alternate name for Mount Misumi, a mountain located in Tottori, Tottori Prefecture, Japan
Tokin (と金), a promoted pawn in shogi
Tokin (鍍金), a Japanese term for plating, particularly mercury silvering

See also
Token (disambiguation)
Tonkin (disambiguation)